Left Alone is a punk rock band from Wilmington, California. They were formed in May 1996 by lead vocalist and guitarist Elvis Cortez. Cortez formed his own label, Smelvis Records, to release Left Alone's records, and has since expanded the label to include numerous other underground bands. Cortez was also the owner of the PCH Club in Wilmington, which is now defunct. Left Alone's music has ska influences, and the band is notable for adhering to a do it yourself ethic by avoiding major labels, booking their own tours, and making their own merchandise.

After releasing numerous demos, splits, and EPs, Left Alone released their first full-length, Streets of Wilmington, in 2002. A year later, the band compiled their earlier, out-of-print recordings on the anthology Left Alone: 1996–2000. In 2003, Cortez went on the Warped Tour as a roadie for the band Destruction Made Simple. After a few weeks of doing nothing as a roadie other than promoting his own band, Elvis was forced to return to LA because his dogs needed surgery. After Warped Tour founder Kevin Lyman heard Left Alone's music, he chose the band to be the Warped Tour BBQ band for the 2004 tour. The band were invited back to be the BBQ band for the 2005 tour. While on the Warped Tour, Tim Armstrong of Rancid heard Left Alone's 2004 album, Lonely Starts & Broken Hearts. Armstrong signed the band to his label, Hellcat Records, and re-released Lonely Starts & Broken Hearts. The band released their third full-length album, Dead American Radio, on August 8, 2006, which features guest appearances from Tim Armstrong and Patricia Day of the Horrorpops.

The band released their self-titled album on April 7, 2009.

They were touring with the Vans Warped Tour 2010.

Since 2011, Elvis Cortez has been a touring member of Tim Armstrong's band Transplants.

Band members 
 Elvis Cortez – lead vocals, guitar
 Jimmy Jam – Bass
 Ben Shaw – Drums
 Pablo Fiasco - Organ

Former members 
Nick Danger – Bass
Wallace Tenenbaum! – Bass
 Ruben Medina – Bass, Vocals
 Salvador Ibarra, Jr. – Drums
 Lawrence Sanchez – Saxophone
 Alfredo Quinonez – Trumpet
 German Castellanos – Trombone
 Ramrod – Drums
 Jonathan "Be@t$" Contreras – Drums
Billy Lopez – Drums
 Ricardo Cruz- Bass
 Armando Garduño-Guitar

Discography

Studio albums
 Streets of Wilmington, Smelvis Records, 2002
 Left Alone: 1996–2000, Smelvis Records, 2003
 Lonely Starts & Broken Hearts, Smelvis Records, 2004
 Lonely Starts & Broken Hearts (re-release), Hellcat Records, 2005
 Dead American Radio, Hellcat Records, 2006 (vinyl release by Durty Mick Records, 2007)
 Streets Of Wilmington, (remastered w/bonus tracks, vinyl only), Blackbird Music, 2009
 Left Alone, Hellcat Records, 2009 (vinyl release by Blackbird Music, 2009)
 Harbor Area, Hellcat Records/Smelvis Records, 2014
 Checkers & Plaid, Smelvis Records, 2021

EPs
 Live at the Roxy, Smelvis Records, 1997
 Stranded Again, Counterfeit Records, 1998
 My Mistake, Smelvis Records, 2000
 Anything for the Kids, Smelvis Records, 2004
 Hate the Day, Hellcat/Smelvis Records, 2013

Compilations/Splits
 Left Alone/Snap Her Split, One Shot Records, 2001
 Voodoo Glow Skulls/Left Alone Split, Smelvis Records, 2004
 Left Alone/Mastema Split 7" (limited edition colored vinyl release) Smelvis Records No. 20, 2005
 Left Alone/Far From Finished Split, Do Tell Records, 2005
 Left Alone/Deadly Sins Split 7" (vinyl release) Durty Mick Records, 2008
 Left Alone/Potato Pirates 7" (vinyl release) Smelvis Records, 2011
 Left Alone/Argyle Street Split 7" (vinyl release) Smelvis Records, 2011
 Left Alone/China Wife Motors Split 7" (vinyl release) Smelvis Records, 2011
Left Alone/Peaceable Jones Split 7" (vinyl release) Smelvis Records, 2011
 Hooligans United a Tribute to Rancid, Smelvis Records, 2015
Manic Hispanic/Left Alone Split 7" (vinyl release) Smelvis Records, 2016
 Rare and Unreleased Tracks 2016

Singles
 The Question, Smelvis Records, 2001
 Wilmington, CA, Smelvis Records, 2002
 Lonely Ride (acoustic demo), Smelvis Records, 2002

Music Videos
 4 Weeks
 Every Night
 I Hate Emo
 Would You Stay Now
 Sad Story
 Broken Promise
 Leather Bound Book
 Black Derby Jacket

References

External links
 Left Alone at Myspace

Hellcat Records artists
Punk rock groups from California